The Wars in Lombardy were a series of conflicts  between the Republic of Venice and the Duchy of Milan  and their respective allies, fought in four campaigns in a struggle for hegemony in Northern Italy that ravaged the economy of Lombardy and weakened the power of  Venice.  They lasted from 1423 until the signing of the Treaty of Lodi in 1454. 
During their course, the political structure of Italy was transformed: out of a competitive congeries of communes and city-states  emerged the five major Italian territorial powers that would make up the map of Italy for the remainder of the 15th century and the beginning of the Italian Wars at the turn of the 16th century. They were Venice, Milan, Florence, the Papal States and Naples.
Important cultural centers of Tuscany and Northern Italy—Siena, Pisa, Urbino, Mantua, Ferrara—became politically marginalized.

The wars, which were both a result and cause of Venetian involvement in the power politics of mainland Italy, found Venetian territory extended to the banks of the Adda and involved the rest of Italy in shifting alliances but only minor skirmishing. 
The shifting counterweight in the balance was the allegiance of  Florence, at first allied with Venice against encroachments by Visconti Milan, then switching to ally with Francesco Sforza against the increasing territorial threat of Venice. 
The Peace of Lodi, concluded in 1454, brought forty years of comparative peace to Northern Italy, as Venetian conflicts focused elsewhere.

After the Treaty of Lodi, there was a balance of power resulting in a period of stability lasting for 40 years. During this time, there was a mutual pledge of non-aggression between the five Italian powers, sometimes known as the Italic League. Even though there was frequent tension between Milan and Naples, the peace held remarkably well until the outbreak of the Italian Wars in 1494, as Milan called upon the king of France to press its claim on the kingdom of Naples.

First campaign
The first of four campaigns against the territorial ambitions of Filippo Maria Visconti, duke of Milan, was connected to the death of the lord of Forlì, Giorgio Ordelaffi. He had named Visconti the trustee of his nine-year-old heir, Teobaldo II. The latter's mother, Lucrezia degli Alidosi, daughter of the lord of Imola, did not agree and assumed the regency for herself. The Forlivesi rebelled and called in the city the Milanese Visconti's condottiero, Agnolo della Pergola (May 14, 1423). Florence reacted by declaring war on Visconti. Its captain Pandolfo Malatesta therefore entered Romagna to help the Alidosi of Imola, but he was defeated and the city stormed on February 14, 1424. The young Luigi degli Alidosi was sent captive to Milan and a few days later the lord of Faenza, Guidantonio Manfredi, joined the Visconti party. The Florentine army, this time commanded by Carlo Malatesta, was again defeated, at the Battle of Zagonara in July; Carlo, taken prisoner, was freed by Visconti and joined him too. Florence thus hired Niccolò Piccinino and Oddo da Montone, but the two were also beaten in Val di Lamone. Oddo was killed but Piccinino was able to convince Manfredi to declare war against Visconti.

After the failure in Romagna, Florence tried to defy the Visconti from the Ligurian side, by allying with the Aragonese of Naples. However, both a fleet of 24 Aragonese galleys sent to Genoa to move it to fight against the Milanese, and a land army, were unsuccessful. In the meantime, Piccinino and the other condottiero Francesco Sforza had been hired by Visconti, who also sent an army to invade Tuscany under Guido Torello. He subsequently defeated the Florentine army at Anghiari and Faggiuola.

The Florentine disaster was countered by the pact signed on December 4, 1425 with the Republic of Venice. By the agreement the war was to be pursued at the common expense of both: the conquests in Lombardy to be assigned to the Venetians; those in Romagna and Tuscany to the Florentines. The condottiero Carmagnola was appointed Captain General of the League. In the ensuing fighting seasons (1425–26), Carmagnola, recently in the pay of Visconti, retook Brescia, which he had recently taken on behalf of Visconti, after a long siege which saw massive use of artillery (November 26, 1426). Meanwhile, the Venetian fleet on the Po River, under Francesco Bembo, advanced as far as Padua, and the Florentines regained all their lands in Tuscany. Visconti, who had already ceded Forlì and Imola to the Pope to gain his favour, called a mediation. Through the intervention of the Papal legate, Niccolò degli Albergati, the peace was signed on December 30, 1426 in Venice.

Visconti regained the lands occupied by Florence in Liguria, but had to renounce the area of Vercelli, conquered by Amadeus VIII of Savoy, and Brescia, which went to Venice, and to promise to stop encroaching himself in Romagna and Tuscany.

Second campaign
The peace did not last very long. Under advice by the emperor Sigismund, Visconti refused to ratify it and the war broke out in May 1427. The Milanese were initially victorious, taking Casalmaggiore and besieging Brescello; the fleet sent there was set on fire by the Venetian fleet of Bembo; however, Niccolò Piccinino was able to defeat Carmagnola at Gottolengo on May 29. The Venetian commander pushed him back and conquered Casalmaggiore on July 12, while Orlando Pallavicino, lord of several castles near Parma, rebelled against the Visconti as Amadeus VIII and John Jacob of Montferrat invaded Lombardy from East.

Visconti could count on some of the best condottieri of the time, such as Sforza, della Pergola, Piccinino and Guido Torello. In order to counter their mutual jealousy, he named supreme commander Carlo Malatesta. The latter led the Milanese at Maclodio (October 4, 1427), being crushed by the Venetians under Carmagnola. The victory was however indecisive, and Visconti managed to be reconciled with Amadeus by ceding him Vercelli and marrying his daughter, Marie of Savoy. However, as Sforza was defeated by some Genoese exiled and Sigismund's help was wanting, Visconti sued for a treaty. With the mediation of the Pope, the peace was signed at Ferrara on April 18, 1428. A Venetian governor was established at Bergamo and Crema (1429) in addition to confirming the Venetian possession of Brescia and its contado (neighbourhood). The Florentines recovered the strongholds they had lost, apart from Volterra, which rebelled against the new settlement. The troops sent to reduce that city, under Niccolò Fortebraccio, were later sent to invade the Lucca, whose lord, Paolo Guinigi, had previously sided with the Visconti.

Third campaign
The third war (1431-1433) started, therefore, when Visconti took up the Lucchese cause, by sending them Francesco Sforza, with 3,000 horse; Sforza, however, was eventually bought off with fifty thousand ducats by the Florentines, who continued the siege of Lucca after the condottiero had left. Called in by the besieged, Visconti managed to have the Republic of Genoa  declare war against Florence. The subsequent defeat on the Serchio banks of their commander Guidantonio da Montefeltro (December 2, 1430), encouraged the Florentines to engage the aid of Venice once more and re-erect their lapsed League, with the favour of the new Pope, Eugene IV, a Venetian. Visconti replied by rehiring Piccinino and Sforza, who were again to face Carmagnola.

The League's army was first beaten at Soncino (May 17, 1431), while Luigi Colonna defeated the Venetians at Cremona, Cristoforo Lavello pushed back the Montferrat troops, and Piccinino established strong positions in Tuscany. Another source of dismay for the revived League was the destruction of the Po Fleet under Niccolò Trevisani near Pavia (June 23). In 1431 Visconti also found a precious ally in Amadeus VIII of Savoy in exchange for his help against John Jacob of Montferrat.

Venice won a naval victory over Genoa at San Fruttuoso on 27 August 1431, but on land  Carmagnola, the commander of Venetian forces, moved cautiously, avoiding a pitched battle and raising the suspicion he could have been bought by Visconti, while the latter was also joined by Sigismund who had entered Italy to receive the imperial crown. In the end Carmagnola was suspended; recalled by the Council of Ten, he was arrested in March 1432, tried for treason and beheaded outside the Doge's Palace. In November 1432 a Venetian army was crushed by Piccinino at the Battle of Delebio by a joint army of Milan and Valtellina, which had been invaded by the Serenissima in 1431.

The peace of Ferrara in May 1433 institutionalized an unsteady status quo. The Florentine war with Lucca and her allies likewise resulted in a return to the previous status quo, but the major League leader's lack of successes had lost much charisma: the Venetian doge Francesco Foscari was on the verge of resigning, while Cosimo de' Medici was imprisoned and confined in Padua. Another result of the peace agreement was the reduction of Montferrat to a satellite of Savoy.

Fourth campaign
In the so-called "fourth war" broader questions were personalized in the combats among antagonistic condottieri: Gattamelata, and later Francesco Sforza fought nominally for Venice, while the Visconti side was led by Niccolò Piccinino, who had promised to Eugene IV to reconquer the Marche for him. But, in a reversal typical of the time, when he captured Ravenna and Bologna, he forced the cities to recognize Milanese suzerainty.

Piccinino, backed by Gian Francesco Gonzaga, had invaded the Lombard possessions of Venice. In September 1438 he laid siege to Brescia and assaulted Bergamo and Verona. In response to this Venice signed an alliance with Florence and Francesco Sforza, including some notable captains of the time such as Astorre II Manfredi, Pietro Persaliano and Niccolò III of Ferrara, who was also restored the Polesine in exchange for his support.

The Milanese were repeatedly defeated in Tuscany and at Soncino (June 14, 1440). The war seemed won for Venice, and Sforza went to Venice to receive the honour of a triumph. However, Piccinino returned from Romagna in February 1441 and crushed Sforza's garrison at Chiari. Sforza besieged Martinengo, but when Piccinino cut him off from any possibility of retreat the situation looked again favourable to Milan. Believing that the victory was now in his hands, he asked from Visconti the signiory of Piacenza in exchange for it. The lord of Milan preferred instead to appeal to Sforza for an agreement.

On the field of Cavriana, Sforza acted as mediator between the two sides, accomplishing the act for which Carmagnola had lost his head. No large territorial changes were made in the ensuing Peace of Cremona of 20 November 1441: Venice kept Ravenna, Florence the Casentino. Piccinino was awarded the lands of Orlando Pallavicino in the Parmense, while Filippo Maria Visconti recognized the independence of Genoa and again promised to stop interfering with the situation in Tuscany and Romagna.

Aftermath

Off the battlefields, important dynastic and political changes occurred: Francesco Sforza entered the service of Visconti and married his daughter, Bianca Maria Visconti, while Florence took a new turn under Cosimo de' Medici. After Visconti died in 1447, Francesco Sforza entered Milan in triumph (May 1450). Two coalitions now formed: Sforza's Milan allied with Medici's Florence on the one hand, faced Venice and the Aragonese Kingdom of Naples on the other. The main theater of war remained Lombardy, where both sides joined in the Peace of Lodi (May 1454), a compromise peace that formed the basis for a general accord among the four contenders, Venice, Milan, Florence and Naples, under the blessings of Pope Nicholas V, representing the fifth power in Italy. The peace of Lodi is often marked as the emergence of a consciously expressed European political principle of balance of power.

See also
War of Ferrara

Notes

References

Further reading

Niccolò Machiavelli, History of Florence Books IV.i-VI.vi The wars in Lombardy from the Florentine perspective.
Veneto.org: History of Venice

15th-century conflicts
Wars involving the Republic of Florence
Wars involving the Duchy of Milan
Wars involving the Republic of Venice
Military history of Italy
15th century in the Republic of Venice